Central Islip is a hamlet and census-designated place (CDP) within the Town of Islip in Suffolk County, New York, United States. The population was 34,450 at the 2010 census.

History and overview

Prior to the arrival of European settlers, the Secatogue tribe of Algonquin native-American people lived in the area now known as Central Islip.

In 1842, the Long Island Rail Road's eastward expansion reached the area, and the Suffolk County Station was opened up. The Suffolk County Station, became the commercial center for housing. With that being done the name Central Islip was thus born, and applied to a new station built in 1873 further to the east. The modern Central Islip station is in a different location from all of its predecessors.

In 1889, what became the Central Islip Psychiatric Center opened. By 1955, it housed over 10,000 patients. It closed in 1996.

In the mid-1990s, Central Islip began a resurgence, with new housing developments, commercial properties, and government complexes. A new federal courthouse complex opened, claimed to be the second largest in the country. On part of the site of the former Central Islip Psychiatric Center's  campus. In 2000, the baseball stadium for Independent league team Long Island Ducks opened up.

Housing developments in Central Islip include:
College Woods
Park Row
Bella Casa Estates
Islip Landing
Courthouse Commons
Waddington Estates
Hawthorne Court (Home Properties)
Coventry Village

Geography

Demographics

As of the census of 2010, there were 34,450 people, 8,792 households, and 6,813 families residing in the CDP. The population density was 4,398.2 per square mile (1,699.2/km2). There were 9,189 housing units at an average density of 1,264.9/sq mi (488.7/km2). The racial makeup of the CDP was 43.6% White, 25.0% African American (U.S. Census), 3.4% Asian, 0.9% from other races, and 5.9% from two or more races. Hispanic or Latino of any race were 52.1% of the population. Foreign-born residents comprised 34.7% of the population.

There were 8,792 households, out of which 26.6% had children under the age of 18 living with them, 8.0% were persons under the age of 5, 3.5% were married couples living together, 17.7% had a female householder with no husband present, and 22.5% were non-families. 16.8% of all households were made up of individuals, and 8.5% had someone living alone who was 65 years of age or older. The average household size was 3.56 and the average family size was 3.87.

In the CDP, the population was spread out, with 29.2% under the age of 18, 11.0% from 18 to 24, 32.5% from 25 to 44, 19.8% from 45 to 64, and 7.4% who were 65 years of age or older. The median age was 32 years. For every 100 females, there were 97.5 males. For every 100 females age 18 and over, there were 93.3 males.

The median income for a household in the CDP was $55,504, and the median income for a family was $57,252. Males had a median income of $35,187 versus $27,842 for females. The per capita income for the CDP was $17,910. About 8.3% of families and 11.4% of the population were below the poverty line, including 15.8% of those under age 18 and 8.7% of those age 65 or over.

As of the 2010 census, there were 34,450 people, 9,365 households, and 6,928 families living in the CDP. The racial/ethnic breakdown was as follows: 
 43.6% White
 25.0% Black
 0.9% Native American
 3.4% Asian
 0.0% Native Hawaiian
 0.4% Some other race
 5.9% Two or more races

In addition, 52.1% was of Hispanic origin.

Schools
The Central Islip Union Free School District operates public schools.
 Pre-K and K
 Early Childhood Center (Alfano)
 Grades 1-6
 Andrew T. Morrow Elementary
 Francis J. O'Neil Elementary
 Marguerite Mulvey Elementary
 Cordello Ave. Elementary
 Mulligan Elementary
 Grades 7-8
 Ralph G. Reed Middle School
 Grades 9-12
 Central Islip Senior High School
 Private Schools within Central Islip:
 St. John of God (Catholic)
 Our Lady of Providence Regional School

Central Islip was home to NYIT (the New York Institute of Technology) and Touro Law Center, located next to the local New York Supreme Court building.

Churches
 Central Islip Seventh-Day Adventist Church, 143 Caleb's Path
 Central Islip Church of Christ
 First Spanish Baptist Church, 51 Hawthorne Avenue
 The First United Methodist Church (Dating back to 1869) on Wheeler Rd.
 Iglesia  Fuente de Agua Viva, 100 East Suffolk Ave Central Islip NY 11722
 Iglesia Bíblica TorreFuerte (Pastores: Bayardo & Ady Delgadillo)'''
 Iglesia Evangelica Resurreccion
 Ministerio Jesu Cristo Vive, 1417 Islip Avenue
 Lighthouse Tabernacle Church of God
 St. John of God Roman Catholic Church (one of the oldest churches in Central Islip)
 The Episcopal Church of The Messiah; {Episcopal Church}
 Kingdom Hall of Jehovah's Witnesses, 268 Suffolk Avenue
 Kingdom Hall of Jehovah's Witnesses, 105 Fig Street
 Restoring Grace Ministries

Transportation

Roads
Major roads within the hamlet of Islip are:
 Suffolk County Road 17, also known as Carleton Avenue through most of the community and Wheeler's Road north of Suffolk Avenue, runs parallel to NY Route 111 (Islip Avenue) from its southern terminus at NY 27A in Islip to its northern terminus at NY 111 near the Long Island Expressway at Exit 56 in Hauppauge.
 Suffolk County Road 67, also known as the Long Island Motor Parkway runs along the northern edge of the community.
 Suffolk County Road 100, also known as Suffolk Avenue, is the main west-to-east route through the community, running from Suffolk County Road 13 in Brentwood to New York State Route 454 in Islandia.
 Southern State Parkway (Exit 43A) runs within nearby Islip Terrace but is close enough to the Islip Terrace/Central Islip border.

Airport
Islip Terrace is west of Long Island MacArthur Airport in Ronkonkoma.

Train
Central Islip Station is located along the Ronkonkoma Branch of the Long Island Rail Road.

Buses
There are many bus stops in Islip Terrace, along the 3C, 3D, 42, 45, and 54. Buses are operated and maintained by the local Suffolk Transportation Service, Inc.

Sports

Notable people

Rick Kittles
Mike Tice
R.A. the Rugged Man
Anthony Cumia
Chrisette Michele
Keith Murray (rapper)
K-Solo
Roy Barker

References

External links

Islip (town), New York
Census-designated places in New York (state)
Hamlets in New York (state)
Census-designated places in Suffolk County, New York
Hamlets in Suffolk County, New York